Marina Kazankova (born 4 August 1981) is a Russian actress and freediver. She appeared in more than fifteen films since 1999.

Selected filmography

References

External links 

1981 births
Living people
Russian film actresses
Russian freedivers